The  Chief of Staff, Fleet  (COSFLEET) also formally known as Chief of Staff to the Commander-in-Chief Fleet was a senior British Royal Navy appointment. The office holder was the Commander-in-Chief, Fleet's principal staff officer responsible for coordinating the supporting staff of Fleet Headquarters, Northwood, from November 1971 to February 2012.

History
Between 1954 and 1971 Royal Navy senior commands were either abolished or merged into fewer but larger commands. In November 1971, the Western Fleet was merged with the Far East Fleet to form a single seagoing command, commonly known as Fleet Command or the FLEET. The Chief of Staff Fleet was the principal staff officer of the Commander-in-Chief, Fleet's who was responsible for coordinating the supporting senior staff of Fleet Headquarters until April 2012 when the post was abolished.

From February 1990 until April 2012 the office holder simultaneously held the joint title of Deputy Commander in Chief, the Fleet.

Chiefs of Staff, Fleet
Post holders included:

References

S